Oleiharenicola lentus is a Gram-negative, aerobic and motile bacterium from the genus of Oleiharenicola which has been isolated from irrigation water from Taiwan.

References

Verrucomicrobiota
Bacteria described in 2020